Events during the year 2004 in Italy.

Incumbents
President: Carlo Azeglio Ciampi 
Prime Minister: Silvio Berlusconi

Events  

 March 6 - Sanremo: Marco Masini wins with the Flying Man at the 54th edition of the Italian Song Festival.
 March 20 - second world day against the war;  millions of people take to the streets all over the world, hundreds of thousands in Rome.
 April 13 - in Iraq four Italians kidnapped.  They are Maurizio Agliana, Umberto Cupertino, Fabrizio Quattrocchi and Salvatore Stefio.  Quattrocchi will be killed, the other three freed after 56 days.
 8 June - the three Italian hostages and a Pole are released in Iraq during a targeted action.
 1 September - in the Mazara del Vallo area, a little girl of 3 years named Denise Pipitone disappears while playing in the street.  the issue will be closed to be reopened in 2021.
1–11 September – 61st Venice International Film Festival
 November 25 - the President of the Italian Republic Carlo Azeglio Ciampi grants pardon to Graziano Mesina, known as "Grazianeddu", former red primrose of Sardinian banditry.
 December 7 - after three years of restructuring, the Teatro alla Scala in Milan reopens with the opera L'Europarecognata by Antonio Salieri.
 December 16 -  the Italian Creative Commons Licenses are presented in Turin.

Film 

 Tre metri sopra il cielo (March 12, 2004)
 Tu la conosci Claudia? (December 16, 2004)
 Christmas in Love (December 17, 2004)
 Volevo solo dormirle addosso (October 15, 2004)
 L'odore del sangue (April 2, 2004)
 Certi bambini (May 14, 2004)
 Che ne sarà di noi (March 5, 2004)
 Non ti muovere (March 12, 2004)
 Agata e la tempesta (February 27, 2004)
 L'amore è eterno finché dura (February 20, 2004)
 Mi piace lavorare (Mobbing) (February 13, 2004)
 La spettatrice (May 7, 2004)
 Dopo mezzanotte (April 23, 2004)
 La rivincita di Natale (January 23, 2004)
 Le chiavi di casa (September 10, 2004)
 Stai con me (June 25, 2004)
 Le conseguenze dell'amore (September 24, 2004)

Deaths  

3 April – Gabriella Ferri, singer (b. 1942).
27 May – Umberto Agnelli, industrialist, head of Fiat (b. 1934).
4 June – 
Nino Manfredi, actor (b. 1921).
Anthony Steffen, film actor and screenwriter (b. 1930)
28 July – Tiziano Terzani, journalist (b. 1938).
31 July – Laura Betti, actress (b. 1927).
22 August – Reginaldo Polloni, rower (b. 1916).
23 August – Francesco Minerva, Roman Catholic archbishop (b. 1904).
26 August – Enzo Baldoni, journalist (b. 1948).
28 August – Silvana Jachino, actress (b. 1916).
12 November – Lelio Marino, Italian-born American entrepreneur (born c. 1935).
16 November – Massimo Freccia, Italian-American conductor (b. 1906).
14 December – Agostino Straulino, sailor (b. 1914).
19 December – Renata Tebaldi, opera singer (b. 1922).

References 

 
2000s in Italy
Years of the 21st century in Italy
Italy
Italy